Smilers is an Estonian rock band formed in 1991 by Hendrik Sal-Saller. The name reportedly originated from a Rod Stewart album, Smiler. The band was first named Lezer Brozers. In the early years Smilers produced two albums in Finland, but as these were not successful, they returned to Estonia and gained fame soon after. Smilers won the Artist of the Year award in the 2004 Estonian Music Awards. Smilers were also awarded a Golden Disc for Song of the Year in 2004 for "Ainult unustamiseks".

Current members

 Hendrik Sal-Saller – vocals, guitar
 Urmas Jaarman – bass, backing vocals
 Mikko Saira – keyboards
 Erko Laurimaa – guitar
 Raido Kurri – drums

Discography
Finland:
 Smilers (1994)
 Take Five (1996)
Estonia:
 Olen kuul (1997)
 Mõistus on kadunud (1998)
 1994–1996 (1999)
 Suure surmaga läbi elu (1999)
 Jalgpall on parem kui sex (2001)
 Remixed (2002)
 Ainult unustamiseks (2003)
 Ainult armastusest (2004)
 Live Unplugged (2005)
 Esimene Eesti tuur (2005)
 Õhus on Smilers (2007)
 ETV Live (2008)
 2009 (2009)
 Viimane (2011)
 SMILERSXX: 20 aastat meteoriitide sajus (2013)

References

External links
Official website

Estonian rock music groups
Musical groups established in 1991
1991 establishments in Estonia
Estonian pop rock music groups